Westward 1847 (also punctuated as Westward-1847) is a 1979 video game written by Jon C. Sherman published by The Software Exchange for the TRS-80 16K. It originally appeared as the cover feature for the October 1979 issue of SoftSide.

Gameplay
Westward 1847 is a game in which the player has 40 weeks to get to Oregon before winter comes.

Reception
Jon Mishcon reviewed Westward 1847 in The Space Gamer No. 34. Mishcon commented that "I recommend this game."

References

External links
Article in Kilobaud Microcomputing

1979 video games
TRS-80 games
TRS-80-only games
Video games developed in the United States